"I'm So Excited" is a song by American vocal group the Pointer Sisters. Jointly written and composed by the sisters in collaboration with Trevor Lawrence, it was originally released in September 1982, reaching number 30 on the US Billboard Hot 100. This was followed by a remixed re-release in July 1984, reaching number 9 on the Billboard Hot 100. Billboard named the song number 23 on their list of "100 Greatest Girl Group Songs Of All Time".

Background
The song was originally recorded for and appeared on the Sisters' 1982 album, So Excited!, and was subsequently released as a single. Upon its release, the single charted at No. 28 on the Billboard Dance Music/Club Play Singles chart, No. 30 on the Billboard Hot 100 and No. 46 on the Billboard R&B Singles chart.  Billboard called it "sexy and fun".

Two years later, on the group's RIAA certified multi-Platinum album Break Out, a slightly remixed and edited version of the song was included and re released as a single. This time, it peaked at No. 9 on the Billboard Hot 100 and No. 25 on the Billboard Adult Contemporary chart.

In March 2001, the song was included in the RIAA and National Endowment for the Arts project Songs of the Century, a list intended to "promote a better understanding of America's musical and cultural heritage." The song was ranked #264 out of 365 songs.

Music video
A music video was filmed for the 1984 re-release release of the single, directed by choreographer Kenny Ortega. In the clip, the sisters are seen getting ready for a formal party at a high society club. Anita Pointer is shown dressing and applying make up; Ruth Pointer, wearing only a nightgown, is shown rolling around on her bed and throwing her garments around; and June Pointer is wearing nothing at all and taking a bubble bath. Once the sisters arrive at the club, they are photographed, attracting the attention of the other party goers. By the video's end, they have the club on its feet jamming to the song. On the video also appears Dorian Harewood.

Personnel 
 Anita Pointer – lead vocals
 Ruth Pointer – backing vocals
 June Pointer – backing vocals
 John Barnes – acoustic piano 
 Michael Boddicker – synthesizer programming 
 Greg Phillinganes – synthesizers 
 William "Smitty" Smith – organ
 George Doering – guitar
 Lee Ritenour – guitar
 Nathan Watts – bass
 John "J.R." Robinson – drums
 Paulinho da Costa – percussion

Personnel (1983) 
Lead vocals: Anita Pointer
Backing vocals: Ruth Pointer, June Pointer
Drums: John "J.R." Robinson
Percussion: Paulinho da Costa
Keyboards, synthesizers: Michael Boddicker, Greg Phillinganes, William D. "Smitty" Smith
Guitars: George Doering, Lee Ritenour
Trumpet: Chuck Findley
Trombone: Richard Hyde
Saxophone: Jim Horn
Programming: Michael Boddicker

Charts

Weekly charts

Year end charts

Certifications

Cover versions
In 2001, Australian Big Brother season one contestant Sara-Marie Fedele teamed up with Australian girl group Sirens to record a cover version of "I'm So Excited", titled "I'm So Excited (The Bum Dance)". This cover was released through BMG Australia on October 15, 2001, as a CD single containing the original version, two remixes, and B-side "Feelin Free". Upon its release, the song reached number 12 on the Australian ARIA Singles Chart, spending four weeks in the top 50.

Usage in media
 In the second season of Saved by the Bell, a singing group performs it, and the scene has led to many YouTube reenactments and even a recreation by Jessie's portrayer, Elizabeth Berkley, on Dancing with the Stars.
 The song appears in advertising of Wowcher in the United Kingdom since 2019; the lyrics in these adverts are “I’m so excited and I just can’t hide, I’ve just seen a Wowcher deal and I think I like it… And if you price real low, I can’t say no.”
 Other films that featured the song include Protocol (1984), Playing for Keeps (1986), Working Girl (1988), Riff-Raff (1991), Eddie Murphy's version of The Nutty Professor (1996), The Story of Us (1999), Transformers: Revenge of the Fallen (2009), and Pedro Almodovar's, I'm So Excited (2013) which also takes its name from the song itself.

References

External links
 

1982 singles
1982 songs
1984 singles
2001 singles
Carroll Baker songs
Planet Records singles
The Pointer Sisters songs
RCA Records singles
Song recordings produced by Richard Perry
Songs written by Anita Pointer
Sony Music Australia singles